Jing Ulrich, née Li (李晶), is Managing Director and the Vice Chairman of Investment Banking at JPMorgan Chase. 

Various publications have listed her among the world's most powerful women. For example, in 2021, for the seventh consecutive year, Forbes China ranked Ulrich among the country's top businesswomen. In October 2013, Fortune magazine for the fourth time, ranked Ulrich among the top 50 most powerful global businesswomen.  Likewise, in October 2013, the South China Morning Post featured Ulrich as one of Hong Kong's 25 most inspirational and influential women. In 2016, she received the inaugural Asian Women Leadership Award from China Daily and Asia News Network.

Education 
In 1990, Ulrich received a bachelor's degree with honors in English and American Literature from Harvard University and in 1992 a master's degree in East Asian Studies from Stanford University.

Career

Early career 
From 1994 to 1996, Ulrich worked as a fund manager for Greater China at Emerging Markets Management in Washington, D.C. and before that as an equity analyst at Bankers Finance Investment.

In his 1990 autobiography, To Life: The Story of a Chicago Lawyer, the jurist Elmer Gertz, a protégé of Clarence Darrow and defender of human rights, devoted several pages to Ulrich, whom he had met when she was still a teenager.

Deutsche Bank 
From 2003 to 2005, Ulrich was managing director of Greater China equities at Deutsche Bank.  Before joining Deutsche Bank, Ulrich spent seven years at CLSA Asia-Pacific Markets, where she led the top-ranked team covering the China market.

J.P. Morgan 
Ulrich is currently vice chairman of investment banking at JPMorgan, which she joined in 2005 as a managing director. Since May 2022, she has been based in New York.

Ulrich created and ran J.P.Morgan's "Hands-on China" series of expert speakers, and she hosted hundreds of corporate CEOs, industry experts, and thought leaders at seminars and meetings worldwide. Each year she organized a China-investment summit that brought together, from forty countries, over two thousand fund managers, corporate executives, and outside experts to discuss opportunities for investing in China. Conferences run by Ulrich included keynote speeches by former officials such as Chinese Premier Zhu Rongji, U.S. President Bill Clinton, Secretary of State Henry Kissinger, and U.K. Prime Minister Tony Blair.

As an advisor to the world’s largest asset-management companies, sovereign-wealth and pension funds, Ulrich’s views influence the allocation of trillions of dollars in assets. She also serves as an advisor to Chinese institutions making investments overseas.

Print and TV media have often interviewed Ulrich for her views on China. Before returning to the U.S. to focus on investment banking, she was a frequent guest of Maria Bartiromo on CNBC's Closing Bell investor news program.  She also appeared on the PBS Nightly Business Report. In Asia she regularly spoke on Bloomberg Television. Ulrich’s views, interviews, and columns have often appeared in publications such as The Financial Times, The New York Times, and The Wall Street Journal.

Board and advisory roles
In May 2019, the annual general meeting of shareholders for adidas AG elected Ulrich as a member of the adidas supervisory board. In 2017, the German multinational firm Bosch appointed Ulrich to its international advisory board. Ulrich also joined the International Chamber of Commerce G20 CEO Advisory Group, which is the main forum for guiding business input into the G20 process. In addition, Ulrich serves on the Strategy Advisory Board of private equity firm L. Catterton and on the China Advisory Panel of real-estate company CapitaLand. In 2016, besides her duties at JPMorgan, Ulrich was appointed to the trade-and-investment task force of the B20 / G20 member states, and in 2014 to the  Asia Pacific Economic Cooperation (APEC) China Business Council Multinational Advisory Committee. Moreover, Ulrich has served as an independent director on the board of GlaxoSmithKline, a global healthcare company, on the board of Italian luxury-goods firm, Ermenegildo Zegna. and on the International Advisory Council of Bocconi University in Italy.

Accolades 
In October 2006, the South China Morning Post and the American Chamber of Commerce in Hong Kong had chosen Ulrich as Hong Kong's Young Achiever of the Year  from among several hundred nominees.

An annual poll of institutional investors, published in June 2007, ranked Ulrich as head of the top China team worldwide – a title she held five times, according to Institutional Investor magazine in June 2007, which put a photo of Ulrich on the cover of its international edition of that issue.  Until she moved into a more senior role, global investors in independent research polls of other publications such as Asiamoney magazine repeatedly chose her as the best China strategist.

In 2009 publications of "商务周刊" (China's "Business Watch Magazine") and "China Entrepreneur" have listed Ulrich among the country's top female business elite, and in May 2009, the Chinese journal "当代经理人" ("Contemporary Manager") named her one of the top ten business leaders in China.  In April 2010, "China International Business Magazine" put Ulrich on its cover for her role linking global investors to opportunities in China, and in August 2010 Vogue China featured her as one of 15 globally influential Asian women.  

In 2010 and 2011 Fortune magazine named Jing Ulrich as one of the 50 most powerful global business women, while the October 2010 and August 2008 editions of Forbes magazine  put Ulrich on Forbes's list of the 100 most powerful women in the world., with the more recent Forbes publication also including her among the world's "20 youngest power women". In 2011 and 2012, FinanceAsia named Ulrich one of the top 20 women in finance and top 30 bankers in China. In March 2012 and 2013, Forbes magazine named her one of Asia's top 50 powerful businesswomen.

As of 2012 the South China Morning Post, China Daily, and others have referred to Ulrich as the "Oprah Winfrey of the investment world".

Personal 
Ulrich is a U.S. citizen and bilingual in Mandarin and English.

References

External links

 Hands-On Series Reports at JPMorgan

Living people
Chinese bankers
Harvard College alumni
JPMorgan Chase people
Deutsche Bank people
GSK plc people
Businesspeople from Beijing
Stanford University alumni
1967 births
Chinese women business executives
People from Beijing